Vittorio Guido Zucconi (August 16, 1944 – May 26, 2019) was an Italian journalist and author. He also had U.S. citizenship.

Early years and education
Zucconi was born in Bastiglia, Province of Modena, Italy. After completing his secondary school at a Classical college, Zucconi received a degree in literature and philosophy from the University of Milan.

Career
Zucconi was director of the online edition of the Italian newspaper La Repubblica, and  served as the U
S. correspondent for the same newspaper. He had previously been a reporter for the Italian daily newspaper Corriere della Sera from Moscow, and for La Stampa from Brussels and Tokyo. Zucconi was also known for several appearances on TV shows as an editorialist. Since summer 2007, he had been teaching graduate classes on Italian history and journalism at Middlebury College in Vermont. He received the America Award of the Italy-USA Foundation in 2015.

Selected bibliography
Il Giappone tra noi (1986)
Si fa presto a dire America (1988)
Parola di giornalista (1990)
Si fa presto a dire Russia (1992)
Stranieri come noi (1993)
Gli spiriti non dimenticano: il mistero di Cavallo Pazzo e la tragedia dei Sioux (1996)
Storie dell'altro mondo: la faccia nascosta dell'America (1997)
Il calcio in testa (2003)
George. Vita e miracoli di un uomo fortunato (2004)

Personal life
Zucconi was married and had two children. He died in May 2019, after a long illness.

Gallery

References

Italian male writers
Italian journalists
Italian male journalists
1944 births
2019 deaths
Writers from the Province of Modena
Middlebury College faculty
University of Milan alumni
Italian emigrants to the United States
American male journalists
Italian radio personalities
La Repubblica people
People with acquired American citizenship